"First Day of My Life" is a single from the album I'm Wide Awake, It's Morning by American band Bright Eyes, released on February 7, 2005. The song reached number 37 on the UK Singles Chart. The video was directed by John Cameron Mitchell.

History
The song was listed at number 266 on Pitchfork Media'''s "Top 500 Tracks of the 2000s".

The music video displays a variety of couples as well as single people wearing headphones while sitting on a couch. The video received a Special Recognition in the 2006 GLAAD Media Awards due to its inclusion of gay and lesbian couples.

It can be heard in the 2007 film Elvis and Anabelle and the film The Bubble.
It was featured in an episode of NBC's Chuck (season 4, episode 23), titled "Chuck Versus the Last Details".
The song has been used for multiple commercials. It was used in a 2012 Zillow commercial. It featured in a 2021 Citibank commercial.

James Corden selected this song as one of his favorites on Radio 4's Desert Island Discs.

In 2013, Stereogum ranked the song number five on their list of the 10 greatest Bright Eyes songs, and in 2020, Paste ranked the song number seven on their list of the 15 greatest Bright Eyes songs.

The song appeared in the 2017 Netflix mini series Atypical (season 2, episode 6), the Showtime series Ray Donovan (season 6, episode 12), and in the CW series Roswell, New Mexico'' (season 1, episode 6 and season 2, episode 5).

Track listing
 "First Day of My Life" (Conor Oberst)
 "When the President Talks to God" (Oberst)
 "True Blue" (Oberst)

Personnel
 Conor Oberst – voice, guitar; keyboards and piano on track 3
 Jesse Harris – guitar
 Tim Luntzel – bass

Certifications

Release history

References

2005 singles
2005 songs
Bright Eyes (band) songs
Saddle Creek Records singles
Songs written by Conor Oberst